The Windsor-Essex Catholic District School Board (WECDSB, known as English-language Separate District School Board of Education No. 37 prior to 1999) is the separate school board that oversees Catholic education in Windsor and the surrounding County of Essex, in Ontario, Canada. Its headquarters are in the Windsor Essex Catholic Education Centre in Windsor. It provides administration to a total of 44 schools which provide classes from kindergarten to grade 12, where Catholic teachings permeate all areas of the curriculum. 

The board was created in 1998 from the merger of the Windsor Separate School Board (WSSB) and the Essex County Separate School Board (ECSSB) as the anglophone and francophone separate school boards.

Overview
The board's budget, spending and activities are directed by trustees who are elected for four-year terms, coincident with municipal elections in Ontario.  Five trustees are elected to represent sections of Windsor, and four represent areas of the County.  Two student trustees are also elected through by-elections of the Student Senate to represent the student body, and the clergy is also represented through a Board Chaplain.

Schools
As of the 2017-2018 school year, the WECDSB administers 34 elementary schools, 3 middle schools, 9 secondary schools.

The secondary schools are:

Assumption College School
Cardinal Carter Catholic High School
Catholic Central High School
F. J. Brennan Catholic High School
Holy Names High School
St. Anne Catholic High School
St. Joseph's Catholic High School
St. Michael's Alternative High School
St. Thomas of Villanova Catholic Secondary School

The middle schools are:
Assumption Middle School
Corpus Christi Middle School
Cardinal Carter Middle School

The Elementary Schools are:

Christ the King
H.J. Lassaline
Holy Cross
Holy Name
Immaculate Conception
L.A. Desmarais
Notre Dame
Our Lady of Mount Carmel
Our Lady of Perpetual Help
Our Lady of the Annunciation
Sacred Heart
St. André (French Immersion)
St. Angela
St. Anne (French Immersion)
St. Anthony
St. Christopher
St. Gabriel
St. James
St. John the Baptist
St. John de Brebeuf
St. John the Evangelist
St. John Vianney
St. Joseph
St. Louis
St. Mary
St. Peter
St. Pius X
St. Rose
St. Teresa of Calcutta
St. William
Stella Maris
W.J. Langlois

Provincial Supervision
Citing financial, labour and organizational issues, the Ontario Ministry of Education appointed a Supervisor (similar to the Emergency Managers in the State of Michigan) to help the struggling school system with its fiscal and organizational problems. 
The Windsor Essex Catholic District School Board has been in financial disarray for years. It is currently the only school board in Ontario to have an accumulated deficit. And, according to the province, has repeatedly failed to present a balanced budget, which is a violation of the Education Act. The Government of Ontario appointed a supervisor to oversee the financial management and administration of the Windsor-Essex Catholic District School Board for an indefinite period of time. The province made the move just hours after a report by an independent auditor made the recommendation. According to the Ministry of Education, the supervisor will return the board to fiscal sustainability, ensure there are no labour disruptions in the coming year and to put the best interests of students first. Norbert Hartmann has been appointed under the Education Act, effective Sept. 4, 2012. Ontario Education Minister Laurel Broten said immediately after the appointment that Hartmann's appointment is open ended and that Hartmann will stay as long as needed.

See also

Greater Essex County District School Board
Conseil scolaire catholique Providence
List of school districts in Ontario
List of high schools in Ontario

References

External links
Windsor-Essex Catholic District School Board

 
Organizations based in Windsor, Ontario